This is a list of bridges of the Merritt Parkway, which is located in 
Fairfield County, Connecticut.

The 69 original bridges were designed by George L. Dunkelberger. Each bridge had a unique design that represented various 1930s architectural styles, such as Art Deco, Art Moderne, French Renaissance, Gothic, Neoclassicism, and Rustic. Some of the bridges have been reconstructed in recent years, and three of the original bridges have been torn down and replaced. The presence of these artistic bridges is one of the reasons that the Merritt Parkway has been listed on the National Register of Historic Places and documented by the Historic American Engineering Record (HAER).

Below is a list of the 42 bridges that cross over the Merritt Parkway and another list of the 39 bridges that the Merritt Parkway uses to cross over another road or major waterway. The lists are arranged from south to north.

Bridges crossing over the Merritt Parkway

Bridges carrying the Merritt Parkway

Bridge drawings

See also
List of bridges documented by the Historic American Engineering Record in Connecticut

References
National Register of Historic Places, Merritt Parkway nomination form, 1991
Connecticut Historic Bridge Inventory, 1991
Connecticut State Highway Log, 2007
National Bridge Inventory, 2008
Images of America - Traveling The Merritt Parkway, Larry Larned, 1998

Bridges in Fairfield County, Connecticut
Road bridges on the National Register of Historic Places in Connecticut
Historic American Engineering Record in Connecticut
National Register of Historic Places in Fairfield County, Connecticut